Garbage Day may refer to:

 An internet meme derived from a scene from the movie Silent Night, Deadly Night Part 2 (1987)
 Garbage Day, a 2002 short work of fiction by Wil McCarthy
 "Garbage Day #3", a 2001 song by hip hop trio KMD from Black Bastards

See also
 Garbage Days Regurgitated, a 2000 EP release by punk band Sloppy Seconds
 Trash Day (disambiguation)